Global Force Wrestling was an American professional wrestling promotion founded in 2014 by Jeff Jarrett, the co-founder and former President of Total Nonstop Action Wrestling (now known as Impact Wrestling), and his wife Karen Jarrett. It is owned and operated via its parent company Global Force Entertainment, LLC.

The promotion ran several live events and tapings for a potential television show. Jeff Jarrett returned to Impact Wrestling in an executive role in January 2017 and Karen Jarrett announced that GFW had "merged" with Impact on April 20, 2017. Impact Wrestling assumed the GFW name the following month, but it was dropped when Jeff Jarrett departed the company four months later. Jarrett resumed promoting events under the name in December 2017, but has not run any events since October 2018.

History

Formation and live events
With Jeff Jarrett out as minority investor of TNA Wrestling, he debuted the branding of Global Force Wrestling (business name Global Force Entertainment, LLC) in April 2014 and began promoting the brand and establishing international partnerships with wrestling promotions across the world. The organization had a strategic partnership with 25/7 Productions and David Broome (creator of NBC's The Biggest Loser). Broome stated that the organization planned to create new on-air content 52 weeks per year.

By August 2014, GFW announced working agreements with Mexican promotion Lucha Libre AAA World Wide (AAA), Japan's New Japan Pro-Wrestling (NJPW) promotion, multiple European promotions, South African promotion World Wrestling Professionals (WWP), and promotions from Australia and New Zealand.
As part of GFW's relationship with New Japan Pro-Wrestling, it presented NJPW's Wrestle Kingdom 9 at the Tokyo Dome on the American pay-per-view market on January 4, 2015. The pay-per-view featured English language commentary from Jim Ross and Matt Striker. Wrestle Kingdom 9 reportedly drew 12,000 to 15,000 buys in North America.

Throughout May 2015, Jarrett announced talent for their roster, which included Bullet Club members Karl Anderson and Doc Gallows, the Killer Elite Squad, and Chael Sonnen as an expert analyst. Jarrett also announced that four champions (Global, NEX*GEN, Tag Team and Women's Champion) would be crowned at the July 24 tapings.

The first Global Force Wrestling house show took place on June 12, 2015, at The Ballpark at Jackson in Jackson, Tennessee, as part of GFW's "Grand Slam Tour", which entailed holding events at minor league baseball stadiums. In that show's main event, Karl Anderson and Doc Gallows defeated the New Heavenly Bodies.

On July 9, 2015, Jeff Jarrett announced that the name of GFW's television program was "Amped". Tapings for Amped took place at the Orleans Arena in Las Vegas, Nevada on July 24, August 21, and October 23, 2015. In a December 2015 interview, Jeff Jarrett said that they had sixteen one-hour shows filmed at the Las Vegas tapings and hoped to have the programs air globally on television in the future.

GFW announced that they had signed an international TV distribution deal with Boulder Creek TV in the UK on September 14, 2015, and with New Zealand's TVNZ Duke on February 18, 2016. Despite this, no tapings of Amped ever aired until 2017, when footage from them was aired as Impact One Night Only pay-per-view specials. Overall, the promotion held 36 live events.

Association with Impact Wrestling and lawsuits
After returning to TNA in early 2017 as the promotion's chief creative officer, Jarrett stated that GFW and the newly renamed Impact Wrestling were "becoming one day-by-day". On the April 20 episode of Impact Wrestling, Karen Jarrett announced that GFW and Impact Wrestling had officially merged. In a press release issued on June 28, Impact Wrestling announced that their parent company, Anthem Sports & Entertainment Corp., had entered into an agreement to acquire the rights to GFW. After the announcement, Impact Wrestling rebranded and took on the Global Force Wrestling name. Jeff Jarrett took an indefinite leave of absence from the company in September and Anthem slowly reverted to using the Impact Wrestling name. Impact Wrestling's rebranding was officially over on October 23, when Impact announced that its business partnership with Jeff Jarrett and GFW was terminated. The deal for Anthem to acquire GFW was never completed and Jeff Jarrett continues to own the rights to GFW.

On August 14, 2018, Jeff Jarrett and Global Force Entertainment announced that it had filed a lawsuit against Anthem Sports & Entertainment in the District Court of Tennessee for copyright infringement over the GFW rights, as Jarrett owned all GFW properties since its creation in 2014. It was revealed on February 19, 2019, that Jarrett filed another lawsuit claiming that Impact Wrestling had deleted the master copies of all 16 hours of GFW Amped. Jarrett also sued in attempt to get the trademarks of his name and likeness from Anthem. Anthem counter-sued in July 2019, arguing that they were the rightful owners of the "Jeff Jarrett" copyright, that Jarrett knew the master tapes had been deleted, that they made no money off of GFW's content and that the looks and trademarks of GFW and their former Global Wrestling Network app are not similar.

A mistrial was declared on July 30, 2020. The jury had come to a verdict but this was voided by a judge after a motion by Anthem stated that comments made by Jarrett's attorney had prejudiced them. In October, Jarrett's request for a new trial was denied without prejudice, meaning that he could have requested a new trial at a later date. However, Jarrett and Anthem reached a settlement in January 2021.

Promotional return
Global Force Wrestling returned with a private show held for the Kentucky Wildcats and Northwestern Wildcats on December 27, 2017.

In May 2018, FITE TV announced that they had reached a deal with Global Force Entertainment to produce content for the streaming network. The first event GFW produced for FITE TV was Starrcast, which was held during the week of All In from August 28 to September 2, 2018. On October 21, 2018, GFW co-produced the NWA 70th Anniversary Show with the National Wrestling Alliance in Nashville, Tennessee. Global Force Wrestling would become dormant in the following year, as Jarrett was hired by WWE as a backstage producer and member of their creative team, a job which would last through to January 2021 as he left in order to pursue new projects potentially related to GFW.

Championships

GFW Global Championship 

|}

GFW NEX*GEN Championship 

|}

GFW Women's Championship 

|}

GFW Tag Team Championship 

|}

Other championships used by GFW

See also 
List of Global Force Wrestling events and specials
List of former Global Force Wrestling personnel
List of Global Force Wrestling tournaments

References

External links 

 
2014 establishments in Tennessee
American professional wrestling promotions
Companies based in Nashville, Tennessee
American companies established in 2014
Entertainment companies established in 2014
Professional wrestling in Nashville, Tennessee